The 2019 CONCACAF Gold Cup was the 15th edition of the CONCACAF Gold Cup, the biennial international men's soccer championship of the North, Central American, and Caribbean region organized by CONCACAF. The tournament was primarily hosted in the United States, with Costa Rica and Jamaica hosting double-headers in the first round of matches in groups B and C, respectively.

The United States were the defending champions, having won the 2017 tournament. With the abolition of the FIFA Confederations Cup, the CONCACAF Cup was annulled and the Gold Cup did not qualify the winner to a major tournament for the first time since 2009.

In February 2018, CONCACAF announced that the tournament would expand to 16 teams from 12.

Mexico won their eighth Gold Cup title (their eleventh CONCACAF championship) with their 1–0 victory over the United States in the final.

Qualified teams

The qualification system was changed and no longer divided into Central American and Caribbean zones. Among the 16 teams, six qualified directly after participating in the 2018 FIFA World Cup qualifying Hexagonal, while the other 10 teams qualified through the 2019–20 CONCACAF Nations League qualifying.

Bermuda and Guyana made their Gold Cup debuts.

Venues
In May 2018, CONCACAF confirmed that matches would be held in Central America and the Caribbean in addition to the United States. This was the first time that the Gold Cup was held in the Caribbean, with all previous matches having taken place in the United States, Mexico, or Canada.

United States
In May 2018, CONCACAF announced the fifteen venues in the United States which would host matches. Soldier Field in Chicago was announced on September 27, 2018, as the venue of the final.

Costa Rica
On November 26, 2018, CONCACAF announced that Costa Rica would host a double-header in the first round of matches of Group B on June 16, 2019, taking place at the Estadio Nacional de Costa Rica in San José.

Jamaica
On April 2, 2019, CONCACAF announced that Jamaica would host a double-header in the first round of matches of Group C on June 17, 2019, taking place at the Independence Park in Kingston.

Seeding and schedule
On August 31, 2018, CONCACAF announced that the top four teams of the September 2018 CONCACAF Ranking Index were seeded for the group stage of the tournament:

The groups and full match schedule were revealed on April 10, 2019, 18:00 EDT (15:00 local time, PDT), in Los Angeles, California, United States.

Squads

Each team had to submit a list of 23 players (three players had to be goalkeepers).

Officials
Match officials were announced on May 15, 2019.

Referees

  Juan Gabriel Calderón
  Henry Bejarano
  Yadel Martínez
  Mario Escobar
  Walter López
  Said Martínez
  Daneon Parchment
  Adonai Escobedo
  Fernando Guerrero
  Marco Ortíz
  John Pitti
  Abdulrahman Al-Jassim
  Iván Barton
  Jair Marrufo
  Armando Villarreal
  Ismail Elfath

Assistant Referees

  Micheal Barwegen
  Kedlee Powell
  Juan Carlos Mora
  William Arrieta
  Helpys Feliz
  Gerson López
  Humberto Panjoj
  Christian Ramírez
  Walter López
  Nicholas Anderson
  Alberto Morín
  Miguel Hernández
  Henri Pupiro
  Taleb Al Marri
  Saoud Al Maqaleh
  Juan Francisco Zumba
  David Morán
  Zachari Zeegelaar
  Caleb Wales
  Frank Anderson
  Ian Anderson
  Corey Parker
  Kyle Atkins

Targeted advanced referee program (TARP)

  Keylor Herrera
  Randy Encarnación
  Reon Radix
  Oshane Nation
  Diego Montaño
  Oliver Vergara
  José Kellys
  José Torres

Group stage
The match dates and the assignments were announced by CONCACAF on October 9, 2018. The quarter-final pairings were later amended on October 12, 2018. The top two teams from each group qualified for the quarter-finals.

All match times listed are EDT (UTC−4), as listed by CONCACAF. If the venue is located in a different time zone, the local time is also given.

Tiebreakers
The ranking of teams in the group stage was determined as follows:
 Points obtained in all group matches (three points for a win, one for a draw, none for a defeat);
 Goal difference in all group matches;
 Number of goals scored in all group matches;
 Points obtained in the matches played between the teams in question;
 Goal difference in the matches played between the teams in question;
 Number of goals scored in the matches played between the teams in question;
 Fair play points in all group matches (only one deduction could be applied to a player in a single match): 
 Drawing of lots.

Group A

Group B

Group C

Group D

Knockout stage

In the knockout stage, if a match was tied after 90 minutes, extra time was played, where a fourth substitute was allowed for each team. If still tied after extra time, the match was decided by a penalty shoot-out.

Bracket

Quarter-finals

Semi-finals

Final

Awards

Winners

Individual awards
The following awards were given at the conclusion of the tournament.
Golden Ball Award:  Raúl Jiménez
Golden Boot Award:  Jonathan David
Golden Glove Award:  Guillermo Ochoa
Best Young Player Award:  Christian Pulisic
Fair Play Award:

Best XI
The technical study group selected the tournament's best XI.

Goalscorers

Sponsors
 Allstate
 Camarena Tequila 
 Cerveza Modelo de México
 Nike, Inc.
 Scotiabank
 Sprint Corporation
 Toyota
 Valvoline

Broadcasting

CONCACAF

International

References

External links

 
2019
Gold Cup
June 2019 sports events in the United States
June 2019 sports events in North America
July 2019 sports events in the United States
International association football competitions hosted by the United States
International association football competitions hosted by Costa Rica
International association football competitions hosted by Jamaica
2019 in American soccer
2018–19 in Costa Rican football
2018–19 in Jamaican football